The boys' ski jumping event at the 2016 Winter Youth  Olympics was held on 16 February at the Lysgårdsbakkene Ski Jumping Arena.

Results

References

External links
Results

Ski jumping at the 2016 Winter Youth Olympics